Events from the year 1709 in Sweden

Incumbents
 Monarch – Charles XII

Events

 June 27 (June 28 in the Swedish calendar; July 8 New Style) – Great Northern War: Battle of Poltava: In Ukraine, Peter the Great, Tsar of Russia, defeats Charles XII of Sweden, thus effectively ending Sweden's role as a major power in Europe.
 The deposed Polish monarch Stanisław I of Poland is given refuge in Kristianstad in Sweden with his family, including Queen Catherine Opalińska and Marie Leszczyńska.

Births

 14 March - Sten Carl Bielke, official, scientist  (died 1753)
 11 July - Johan Gottschalk Wallerius, chemist and mineralogist (died 1785)
 Carl Johan Cronstedt, architect, inventor, Earl, noble, civil servant, scientist and bibliophile   (died 1779)
 Henrika Juliana von Liewen, politically active baroness (died 1779)

Deaths

 17 February - Erik Benzelius the Elder, theologian and Archbishop of Uppsala (born 1632)
 9 April - Israel Kolmodin, hymnwriter and Lutheran priest (born 1643)
 24 May - Nils Gyldenstolpe (1642–1709), count, official and diplomat (born 1642)
 28 June - Gustaf Adlerfelt, historical writer (born 1671)
 September 7 - Gunno Dahlstierna, poet (born 1661)

References

External links

 
Years of the 18th century in Sweden
Sweden